Torrents of Spring (Italian: Acque di primavera) is a 1942 Italian drama film directed by Nunzio Malasomma and starring Gino Cervi, Mariella Lotti and Vanna Vanni.

It was shot at the Cinecittà Studios in Rome. The film's sets were designed by the art directors Alfredo Montori and Mario Rappini.

Cast
 Gino Cervi as Francesco 
 Mariella Lotti as Ilse, sua moglie 
 Vanna Vanni as La dottoressa Anna Soldani 
 Paolo Stoppa as Il dottore Berni 
 Carlo Lombardi as Alberto Claubert 
 Annibale Betrone as Il professore Weber 
 Marina Doge as Lucia
 Wanda Capodaglio as La zia di Ilse 
 Vittorina Benvenuti as La capo infermiera 
 Armando Migliari as Il nonno in attesa 
 Joop van Hulzen as La guida alpina nella baita 
 Edda Soligo as Un'infermiera

References

Bibliography 
 Roberto Chiti & Enrico Lancia. I film: Tutti i film italiani dal 1930 al 1944. Gremese Editore, 2005.

External links 
 

1942 films
Italian drama films
Italian black-and-white films
1942 drama films
1940s Italian-language films
Films directed by Nunzio Malasomma
Films shot at Cinecittà Studios
1940s Italian films